The following is a list of tunnels in Pennsylvania.

Rail tunnels
Acheson Tunnel, Pittsburgh and West Virginia Railway, Washington County
Allegheny River Tunnel, Pittsburgh Light Rail, Pittsburgh
Benford Tunnel, CSX Transportation, Confluence, daylighted in 2012 
Big Savage Tunnel,  Wellersburg, was Western Maryland Railway, now Rails-to-trails
Bow Ridge Tunnel (1864), Pennsylvania Railroad, Westmoreland County
Bow Ridge Tunnel (1907), Pennsylvania Railroad,  Westmoreland County
Buxton Tunnel, Pittsburgh and West Virginia Railway, Avella, Washington County, one mile east of the West Virginia border 
Black Rock Tunnel, Phoenixville, Reading Railroad
Broad Street Tunnel, carrying the Broad Street Subway under Broad Street but over submerged .
Brook Tunnel, CSX Transportation
Buck Mountain Coal Company Gravity Railroad Tunnel, Carbon County (abandoned) 
Carr's Tunnel Penn Central Greensburg, Pennsylvania
Catasauqua Tunnel, Lehigh and New England Railroad (abandoned), Catasauqua, Lehigh County, both portals covered, 735 feet
Center City Commuter Connection Tunnel, Philadelphia, SEPTA
Coburn Tunnel, Centre County, Pennsylvania Railroad (abandoned, now part of Penns Creek Trail)
Columbia Tunnel, Columbia, Pennsylvania Railroad (Columbia Branch) (abandoned)
Conococheague Mountain Tunnel, Path Valley Railroad, Perry County (incomplete, abandoned  from north portal) 
Cork Run Tunnel, Pennsylvania Railroad, Pittsburgh
Crown Avenue Tunnel, Scranton, Lackawanna and Wyoming Valley Railroad (now Electric City Trolley) 
Dillinger Tunnel, Emmaus, Reading Railroad (Perkiomen Branch) 
Factoryville Tunnels, east tunnel built in 1851, west tunnel built in 1883, both abandoned in 1915. (Delaware, Lackawanna, and Western Railroad,) Factoryville to Nicholson
Falls Cut Tunnel, CSX Transportation
Flat Rock Tunnel, Gladwyne, Reading Railroad (aside of and visible from the Schuylkill Expressway) 
Friendship Tunnel, Clearfield County, New York Central Railroad (abandoned)
Fulton Tunnel, Clearfield, New York Central Railroad
Gallitzin Tunnel, Pennsylvania Railroad, through Allegheny Mountain and under the Eastern Continental Divide
Girard Tunnel, St. Clair, Mill Creek Mine Railroad (abandoned) 
Grays Ferry Tunnel, CSX, Grays Ferry, Philadelphia
Greer Tunnel, Norfolk Southern, Washington County
Hauto Tunnel, Lansford, Lehigh and New England Railroad (abandoned), 3800 feet
Hickory Tunnel, Pittsburgh and West Virginia Railway, Washington County
Hogback Tunnel, Centre County, Beech Creek Railroad
Howard Tunnel, Northern Central Railway, New Salem, second oldest active U.S. railroad tunnel, constructed in 1837, now on the York County Heritage Rail Trail
Hoyt Tunnel, Clearfield County, New York Central Railroad (abandoned)
Jacks Mountain Tunnel, Adams County, was Western Maryland Railway, now CSX
Jeddo Tunnel, Hazle Brook, Reading and Northern Railroad (former Lehigh Valley Railroad)
J&L Tunnel, CSX Transportation, Pittsburgh
Karthaus Tunnel, Karthaus, Clearfield County, New York Central Railroad
Lake Shore Tunnel, Oil City (abandoned) 
Lofty Tunnel, Schuylkill County, Reading Railroad, under Broad Mountain and the divide between the Delaware and Susquehanna River  watersheds (abandoned) 
Mahanoy Tunnel, Mahanoy City, Reading Railroad, under Broad Mountain and the divide between the Delaware and Susquehanna River watersheds 
Market Street Tunnel (West Philadelphia and Center City Philadelphia), carrying rapid transit and streetcars under Market Street and the Schuylkill River
Market Street Tunnel (West Philadelphia), carrying commuter rail trains under 32nd Street, and including an abandoned branch
McGugin Tunnel, Pittsburgh and West Virginia Railway, Washington County 
Montour Tunnel, Montour Railroad, Washington County abandoned.
Mount Cobb Tunnel, constructed 1850, used until 1885. Pennsylvania Coal Company Gravity Railroad, Mt. Cobb, Lackawanna County (abandoned)
Nay Aug Tunnel, Dunmore, Delaware, Lackawanna, and Western Railroad
Negro Mountain Tunnel, initial construction done for the South Pennsylvania Railroad, but later omitted from the Pennsylvania Turnpike.
Nicholson Tunnel, Built by Delaware, Lackawanna, and Western Railroad in 1915, Factoryville to Nicholson Still used by Canadian Pacific Railway, and Norfolk Southern Railway trackage rights trains.
Panther Hollow Tunnel, CSX Transportation, Pittsburgh
Peale Tunnel, Centre County, Beech Creek Railroad (abandoned - now part of Snow Shoe Rail-Trail)
Penobscot Mountain Tunnel, Wilkes-Barre and Hazleton Railway, Nuangola, Pennsylvania (abandoned, north portal filled below ) 
Perkasie Tunnel, Perkasie, Reading Railroad (Bethlehem Branch) 
Pinkerton Tunnel 2, Pinkerton, Somerset County, Western Maryland Railway (abandoned)
Pinkerton Tunnel, Pinkerton, Somerset County, B&O Railroad, now CSX Transportation Scheduled to be daylighted in 2012
Phoenixville Tunnel (a.k.a. Fairview Tunnel), Phoenixville, Pennsylvania Railroad (Schuylkill Valley Branch) (abandoned)
Poe Paddy Tunnel, Centre County, Pennsylvania Railroad (abandoned - now part of Penns Creek Trail)
Pottsville Tunnel, Pottsville, Pennsylvania Railroad (Schuylkill Valley Branch) (abandoned)
Pulpit Rock Tunnel, Port Clinton, Reading Railroad (abandoned), constructed 1838
Quemahoning Mountain Tunnel, Pittsburgh, Westmoreland and Somerset Railroad, omitted from the Pennsylvania Turnpike 
Radebaugh Tunnel, west of Greensburg, Pennsylvania Railroad, daylighted
Rockport Tunnel, Rockport, Carbon County, Lehigh Valley Railroad (in Lehigh Gorge State Park, south portal visible from towpath across the river) 
Sabula Tunnels, Pennsylvania Railroad and Baltimore and Ohio Railroad, Clearfield County (go under the Eastern Continental Divide) 
Saint Clair Tunnel, St. Clair, Pennsylvania Railroad (abandoned) 
Saltsburg Tunnel, Norfolk Southern Railway, Saltsburg
Sand Patch Tunnel, Somerset County, under the Eastern Continental Divide:
First tunnel (1871), Pittsburgh and Connellsville Railroad (later Baltimore and Ohio Railroad) (abandoned) 
Second tunnel (1913), Baltimore and Ohio Railroad (now CSX Transportation) 
Schenley Tunnel, P&W Subdivision, Pittsburgh
Shawville Tunnel, Shawville, Clearfield County, New York Central Railroad
Shoofly Tunnel, CSX Transportation, daylighted in 2012, Confluence
Shuman Tunnel, Mainville, Columbia County, Reading Railroad (Catawissa Branch) (abandoned)
Sideling Hill Tunnel, former Pennsylvania Turnpike, Fulton County
Sideling Hill Tunnel (1874), East Broad Top Railroad, Huntingdon County
Spruce Creek Tunnels, Pennsylvania Railroad, Huntingdon County
Staple Bend Tunnel, first U.S. railroad tunnel, Allegheny Portage Railroad, Conemaugh Township, Cambria County (abandoned but now part of the historic Allegheny Portage Railroad) 
State Line Tunnel, Pittsburgh and West Virginia Railway, Washington County 
Tamaqua Tunnel, Tamaqua, Reading and Northern Railroad (former Reading Company)
Temple Tunnel, Wheeling & Lake Erie Railway, Fallowfield Township, Washington County.
Turn Hole Tunnel, Jim Thorpe, Central Railroad of New Jersey (at the Glen Onoko access, abandoned but popular with Lehigh Gorge State Park guests) 
Vosburg Tunnel, Lehigh Valley Railroad, Vosburg, Wyoming County
Wabash Tunnel, Pittsburgh and West Virginia Railway, Pittsburgh
Wadesville Tunnel, Wadesville, Danville and Pottsville Railroad (destroyed by strip mining), second U.S. railroad tunnel
White Cottage Tunnel, Pennsylvania Railroad, near Holbrook, Greene County
White Haven Tunnel, White Haven, Central Railroad of New Jersey
White Tunnel, Buffalo and Pittsburgh Railroad, Indiana
Whitehall Tunnel originally B&O Railroad, Allegheny County, Pennsylvania
Windsor Castle Tunnel, Allentown Railroad, Windsor Castle, Berks County, Pennsylvania (incomplete/abandoned) 
Wrays Hill Tunnel, East Broad Top Railroad, Huntingdon County
Yatesville Tunnel, Yatesville, Lackawanna and Wyoming Valley Railroad (abandoned)

Road tunnels

Other transportation tunnels
Auburn Tunnel on the Schuylkill Canal, Auburn, daylighted in 1857
Union Canal Tunnel, Lebanon

See also
List of tunnels documented by the Historic American Engineering Record in Pennsylvania
List of tunnels in the United States

References 

 
Tunnels
Tunnels
Pennstlvania